The 15th District of the Iowa Senate is located in southern Iowa, and is currently composed of Jasper and Polk Counties.

Current elected officials
Zach Nunn is the senator currently representing the 15th District.

The area of the 15th District contains two Iowa House of Representatives districts:
The 29th District (represented by Wes Breckenridge)
The 30th District (represented by Brian Lohse)

The district is also located in Iowa's 2nd congressional district, which is represented by U.S. Representative Mariannette Miller-Meeks and Iowa's 3rd congressional district, which is represented by Cindy Axne.

Past senators
The district has previously been represented by:

Theodore Perry
Arthur Gratias, 1983–1986
Kenneth D. Scott, 1987–1990
Allen Borlaug, 1991–1998
Betty Soukup, 1999–2002
Robert Dvorsky, 2003–2012
Dennis Black, 2013–2014
Chaz Allen, 2015–2018
Zach Nunn, 2019–present

See also
Iowa General Assembly
Iowa Senate

References

15